William Lester DeMars (August 26, 1925 – December 10, 2020) was an American shortstop and coach in Major League Baseball. He was born in Brooklyn, New York and attended New Utrecht High School.

Career

Originally signed by his hometown Brooklyn Dodgers during the Second World War, DeMars was selected by the Philadelphia Athletics in the 1947 rule 5 draft after batting .328 with 88 runs batted in for the Class B Asheville Tourists of the Tri-State League – DeMars' best overall season in professional baseball. He spent the prime of his career with the Triple-A Toronto Maple Leafs of the International League from 1952 to 1955.

On May 25, 1958 DeMars began an 11-year minor league managerial career in the Baltimore Orioles' farm system with the Class C Aberdeen Pheasants of the Northern League, who had lost 23 of their first 25 games. While the Pheasants continued to flounder under DeMars, winning only 37 of 100 games, the improved performance earned DeMars an invitation to return to the Orioles' system with the Class C Stockton Ports of the California League in 1959, where he posted a winning record. He managed in the Baltimore organization through 1968 — working alongside future Major League managers such as Earl Weaver, Joe Altobelli, Darrell Johnson, Jim Frey, Clyde King, Cal Ripken Sr., and Billy Hunter. He succeeded Weaver as pilot of the AAA Rochester Red Wings in 1968 and led the Red Wings into the playoffs. Overall, his managing record was 711 wins, 729 losses (.493) with one championship, won with the Class A Fox Cities Foxes of the Midwest League in 1964.

DeMars began a 19-year Major League coaching career with the  Philadelphia Phillies. He was a member of the Phillies' staff for 13 seasons, including the  world championship club – first in Phillies' history — and National League East Division champion teams in 1976–1977–1978. DeMars left the Phillies after the  season and coached six more seasons with the Montreal Expos (1982–1984) and Cincinnati Reds (1985–1987), where he was a key advisor to playing manager Pete Rose; Rose called DeMars the best hitting coach with whom he had ever worked. Although his 1987 resignation from the Cincinnati coaching staff ended his MLB career, DeMars remained in baseball and returned to the Phillies as a roving minor league batting instructor during the 1990s.

DeMars died December 10, 2020, at the age of 95.

References

 Douchant, Mike, and Marcin, Joe, eds., The 1976 Official Baseball Register. St. Louis: The Sporting News, 1976.

External links

 

1925 births
2020 deaths
Aberdeen Pheasants players
Asheville Tourists players
Baseball coaches from New York (state)
Buffalo Bisons (minor league) players
Burials at Bay Pines National Cemetery
Cincinnati Reds coaches
Lancaster Red Roses players
Major League Baseball first base coaches
Major League Baseball hitting coaches
Major League Baseball shortstops
Major League Baseball third base coaches
Minor league baseball managers
Montreal Expos coaches
Nashua Dodgers players
Olean Oilers players
Philadelphia Athletics players
Philadelphia Phillies coaches
Portland Beavers players
Rochester Red Wings managers
St. Louis Browns players
San Antonio Missions players
Sportspeople from Brooklyn
Baseball players from New York City
Stockton Ports players
Toronto Maple Leafs (International League) players
Vancouver Mounties players